There are a great number of music competitions that offer prizes for performance and composition in both classical and popular music. Prizes may be monetary, but may also be in the form of less tangible things such as scholarships, recording contract, concert performances, a chance to have one's composition published or performed by an orchestra, etc. Some music festivals—even though there may be a "winner"—offer nothing more than exposure on television. That is important for musicians, but not technically a "prize" and those items are not included on this list. Nor are in-house conservatory prizes included—that is, competitions open only to students of the respective conservatory. This list includes competitions that are, generally speaking,  open to "all-comers," although some of them impose age limits or residency (in Italy) requirements.  The list, below, divided by area of interest; that is, classical, jazz, opera, instrumental, etc. Most of the competitions listed are annual affairs. Where possible, the competition name is linked to an external site, or an email address is provided where further details should be available.

Popular music
 Italian Music Awards

Classical music

piano
'International Piano Competition 'Mauro Paolo Monopoli Prize'
Barletta. Puglia
International Piano Competition 'Mauro Paolo Monopoli Prize'
A.M.A. Calabria  international piano competition.
Catanzaro  
 "Arcangelo Speranza" European piano competition
Taranto, Puglia
 "A. Scriabin" international piano competition
Grosseto, Tuscany
 "Fryderyk Chopin "Young Pianists" competition
Rome
 "Pausilypon" piano competition
 Naples, conservatory.
 International Busoni piano competition
Bolzano

violin

 National competition for interpretation of the Mozart violin concerti
Parma
 "A.Curci" international violin competition
Naples
 Ave Maria Prize Award www.avemaria.mono.net - Stresa

guitar
 Michele Pittaluga International Classical Guitar Competition 
Alessandria, Piedmont
 International guitar competition
Nuoro, Sardinia

miscellaneous instrumental/voice
 Hyperion competition for performance; piano, guitar, strings, voice
Ciampino, Roma
Val Tidone International Music Competitions
Various disciplines: composition, performance on piano, accordion, chamber music. 
Piacenza
 International "City of Barletta Young Musicians" competition
Barletta,  
Website 'Città di Barletta' Young Musician Intl. Competition
Sections: piano, strings, guitar, chamber music ensemble, wind instruments.
 International clarinet competition
Bari
"Gianbattista Viotti" International music competition
performance awards for voice, piano
Vercelli
Concorso Internazionale di Interpretazione di Musica Contemporanea “Fernando Mencherini”
 Cagli (PU)
 Prizes for performance of contemporary music by Fernando Mencherini

Chamber music
International Carlo Evasio Soliva competition for piano and chamber music
Casale Monferrato

 City of Chieri International Chamber music  competition
Chieri, Piedmont
 "Trieste Trio" International competition for chamber music groups with piano.
Trieste
"Vittorio Gui" international chamber music competition
Florence
 "Paolo Borciani" international string quartet competition
Reggio Emilia
 International chamber music competition
A. Scontrino  music conservatory
Trapani

Composition
 'Città di Barletta' International Composition Competition
Barletta
Website Città di Barletta Competition 
 International Composition Competition in memory of Camillo Togni
Brescia 
 "Sandro Fuga" National Competition for Chamber Music Composition
Music conservatory,  Torino
 "Valentino Bucchi" Prize: Words and Music for the Peoples' Unity
Rome, International Composition Competition
"G. Petrassi" International Competition for Composers
Parma
"Egidio Carella" composition competition
Stradella (PV)

Vocal

 "Ave Maria Price Award" competition for all www.avemaria.mono.net in Stresa :Stresa
 International competition for Verdian voices
Busseto, Parma 
 "Tito Schipa" international opera competition for young singers
Lecce
 "Anselmo Colzani" international opera competition
Budrio (Bologna)
 "Adriano Belli" competition for new opera
Spoleto
 "Maria Callas" competition, "New voices for Verdi"
Parma
 International polyphonic competition (for choirs)
Arezzo

Jazz
International competition for jazz arranging and composition
Barga, (LU)

Miscellaneous
City of Chieri International music competition
Wind Instruments
Chieri, Piedmont 
 MusicDocFest  prize for films about music
Rome
 "A. Toscanini" international conducting competition
Parma
 "Antonio Pedrotti" International Conducting Competition
Trento

See also
World Federation of International Music Competitions

Awards
 
Awards
Italian music awards